Klon  is a village in the administrative district of Gmina Rozogi, within Szczytno County, Warmian-Masurian Voivodeship, in northern Poland. 

The village has a population of 480.

References

Klon